Jägarvallen is a city district in Linköping with a little over 140 households and almost 400 residents. It is located on the outskirts of the city, between Ryd and Malmen airfield, and is crossed by an old stretch of the road to Mjölby.

The eastern part of Jägarvallen is dominated by an industrial area, while the western end, closest Malmen airfield, has apartment buildings.

Geography of Linköping